Studio J is an in-house label created by Park Jin-young in January 2015. Park described Studio J as a label which will launch JYPE into a new direction in music. The sub-label will create music which rather than appealing to the mainstream will instead showcase free and deep artists. Few days later he revealed G.Soul to be the first artist on Studio J's roster.

History
J. Y. Park announced the new label that "rather than appealing to the mainstream we hope to showcase free and deep artists.” On January 19, 2015, G.Soul made his debut with the album Coming Home and became the first artist of Studio J after being a trainee for 15 years. 

On September 7, 2015, Studio J debuted its first group, a six-membered pop-rock band Day6 namely: Sungjin/박성진 (guitar), Jae/박제형 (guitar), Young K/Brian/강영현 (bass), Junhyeok/임준혁 (keyboard), Wonpil/김원필 (synthesizer), and Dowoon/윤도운 (drum).

On December 29, 2016, Studio J announced that Day6 will have their monthly project in 2017 titled Every DAY6. The project would release two songs every month on the sixth (except May, June, August and October) along with concerts before the release of monthly song.

On November 1, 2021, JYP announced their new band Xdinary Heroes.

Artists
Groups/Bands
 Day6
  Xdinary Heroes

Sub-unit
 Even of Day

Soloists 
 Young K
 Dowoon
 Wonpil

Former Artists
G.Soul (2015–2017)
Jo Kwon
Park Jimin (2012–2019)
 Baek Yerin (2012–2019)
 Baek A Yeon (2012–2019)
Jae Park (2015–2021)
 Bernard Park (2014–2022)

Discography

2015

2016

2017

2018

2019

2020

2021

2022

References

JYP Entertainment